Elections to Newham London Borough Council in London, England was held on 6 May 2010. This was on the same day as other local elections and the general election to the UK Parliament.

The whole council, including the directly elected mayor, was up for election for the first time since the 2006 election. The Labour Party won all 60 seats on the borough council, with support for the Respect Party, who had come second in 2006, collapsing from 23% to 3%. Both Respect and the Christian Peoples Alliance lost all of their seats.

Summary of results

|}

Background
A total of 221 candidates stood in the election for the 60 seats being contested across 20 wards. Candidates included a full slate from the Labour party (as had been the case at every election since the borough council had been formed in 1964), whilst the Conservative party ran 59 candidates and the Liberal Democrats ran 11 candidates. Other candidates running were 59 Christian Peoples Alliance, 12 Respect, 10 Communities United Party, 1 Green, 1 UKIP, 1 British Public Party and 7 Independents.

Ward results

Beckton

Boleyn

Canning Town North

Canning Town South

Custom House

East Ham Central

East Ham North

East Ham South

Forest Gate North

Forest Gate South

Green Street East

Green Street West

Little Ilford

Manor Park

Plaistow North

Plaistow South

Royal Docks

Stratford and New Town

Wall End

West Ham

By-elections between 2010 and 2014
There were no by-elections.

References

External links
LB Newham election site

2010
2010 London Borough council elections
May 2010 events in the United Kingdom